Judith ("Jodi") Anderson (born November 10, 1957, in Chicago, Illinois) is a retired heptathlete from the United States. While attending college at California State University, Northridge, Anderson qualified for the 1980 U.S. Olympic team but did not compete due to the U.S. Olympic Committee's boycott of the 1980 Summer Olympics in Moscow, Russia. She was one of 461 athletes to receive a Congressional Gold Medal instead.
She set the world's best year performance in the women's long jump in 1981. She did compete for her native country at the 1984 Summer Olympics in Los Angeles, California.

References

External links

1957 births
Living people
American heptathletes
American female long jumpers
Athletes (track and field) at the 1979 Pan American Games
Athletes (track and field) at the 1984 Summer Olympics
Olympic track and field athletes of the United States
Track and field athletes from Chicago
Pan American Games medalists in athletics (track and field)
Pan American Games silver medalists for the United States
Congressional Gold Medal recipients
Universiade medalists in athletics (track and field)
Universiade bronze medalists for the United States
Medalists at the 1977 Summer Universiade
Medalists at the 1979 Summer Universiade
Medalists at the 1979 Pan American Games
21st-century American women